Herniaria hirsuta is a species of flowering plant in the family Caryophyllaceae known by the common name hairy rupturewort. It is native to Eurasia and North Africa, and it is known on other continents, including North America, as an introduced species. The small, fuzzy, pale green leaves are up to about a centimeter long and coat the stems. The inflorescences appear in the leaf axils. Each contains three to eight hairy green sepals and no petals. The fruit is a tiny bumpy utricle containing one seed.

This plant is used in Morocco as an herbal remedy for kidney stones.

References

External links

Jepson Manual Treatment
USDA Plants Profile
Flora of North America
Photo gallery: ssp. cinerea

hirsuta
Flora of Lebanon
Plants described in 1753
Taxa named by Carl Linnaeus